German submarine U-771 was a Type VIIC U-boat of Nazi Germany's Kriegsmarine during World War II. She was ordered	on 21 November 1940, and was laid down on 21 August 1942 at Kriegsmarinewerft, Wilhelmshaven, as yard number 154. She was launched on 26 September 1943 and commissioned under the command of Oberleutnant zur See Helmut Block on 18 November of that year.

Design
German Type VIIC submarines were preceded by the shorter Type VIIB submarines. U-771 had a displacement of  when at the surface and  while submerged. She had two shafts and two  propellers.

U-771 was fitted with five  torpedo tubes (four fitted at the bow and one at the stern), fourteen torpedoes, one  SK C/35 naval gun, (220 rounds), one  Flak M42 and two twin  C/30 anti-aircraft guns. The boat had a complement of between forty-four and sixty.

Service history
U-771 had a comparatively brief service career. While she was commissioned  on 18 November 1943, she was not assigned to any war flotillas until 1 June 1944. She was in action for less than a year before being sunk on 11 November 1944, after only two patrols at sea.

First patrol
Following training exercises with the 31st U-boat Flotilla from 18 November 1943 until 31 May 1944, U-771 was assigned to the 9th U-boat Flotilla on 1 June 1944, and was given the position as the lead boat in the flotilla. The next day, U-771 left the port city of Hatvik for Bergen, occupied Norway. On 21 June 1944, U-771 began her first war patrol, leaving the port city of Stavanger (at which she had arrived from Bergen the day before). For a period of 25 days, U-771 roamed the North Sea in search of Allied convoys. While she never made contact with any enemy vessels, on 26 June 1944, a British Consolidated Liberator aircraft coded 'N' from No. 86 Squadron RAF engaged U-771 and  just north of the British Isles. U-317 was sunk during the action, but flak from U-771 damaged the Liberator and forced it back to base, where it was judged damaged beyond repair. U-771 continued her patrol. This was the only time during the war that U-771 had any contact with the enemy prior to her sinking. On 15 July, U-771 returned to her U-boat base at Bergen.

Second patrol
U-771 spent the next three months travelling to various Norwegian ports, including Trondheim, Kristiansand, Bergen, Bogenbucht, and Hammerfest. During this time, U-771 was reassigned to the 11th U-boat Flotilla on 1 August 1944; she remained a part of that flotilla until 30 September, when she was again reassigned, this time to the 13th U-boat Flotilla. On 14 October 1944, U-771 finally left Hammerfest and headed into the Arctic Ocean. Twenty-nine days after she left Hammerfest, on 11 November 1944, U-771 was sunk in the Andfjord near Harstad, Norway, by torpedoes fired by the British submarine . All 51 of her crewmembers were killed.

Wolfpacks
U-771 took part in three wolfpacks, namely:
 Zorn (27 – 30 September 1944) 
 Regenschirm (14 – 16 October 1944) 
 Panther (16 October – 10 November 1944)

See also
 Battle of the Atlantic

References

Bibliography

External links

German Type VIIC submarines
U-boats commissioned in 1943
U-boats sunk in 1944
World War II submarines of Germany
1943 ships
World War II shipwrecks in the Arctic Ocean
Ships built in Wilhelmshaven
U-boats sunk by British submarines
Ships lost with all hands
Maritime incidents in November 1944